Paąžuolė is a village in , Varėna district municipality, Alytus County, southeastern Lithuania. According to the 2001 census, the village had a population of 25 people. At the 2011 census, the population was 13.

The village was likely established at the end of the 18th century after the massive forest cuts.

The meaning of Paąžuolė is "under the oak". The coniferous woods are dominant in the area, but there are many oaks as well.

Between the World War I and World War II Rytas Elementary School was situated in the village.

References

Villages in Varėna District Municipality